The Brandenburg Gate on the Luisenplatz in Potsdam, not to be confused with the gate of the same name on Berlin's Pariser Platz, was built in 1770–71 by Carl von Gontard and Georg Christian Unger by order of Frederick II of Prussia. It stands at the western end of Brandenburger Straße, which runs in a straight line up to the Church of St. Peter and St. Paul.

Previously, from 1733, there was another, simpler gate on the same spot, which resembled a castle gateway. Together with the city wall, a form of toll or excise barrier, and the other gates it was intended to prevent desertion and smuggling.

Towards the end of the Seven Years' War, Frederick the Great had the old gate demolished and built, in its stead, this new Brandenburg Gate, as a symbol of his victory. For that reason the Brandenburg Gate resembles a Roman triumphal arch. Its prototype was the Arch of Constantine in Rome. The Roman influence of its architectural style can be seen, for example, in the double columns of Corinthian order as well as the design of the attic.

A feature of the Brandenburg Gate is that it has two completely different sides, designed by two architects. Carl von Gontard designed the city side, his pupil, Georg Christian Unger, the field or countryside-facing side. Gontard made the city side as a rendered facade with Corinthian-style lesenes and trophies, Unger designed the field site in the style of the Arch of Constantine with Corinthian double-columns and ornamentation like the golden trumpets. The two side entrances for pedestrians were not added until 1843, under Frederick William IV, in order to cope with the increase in pedestrian traffic.

At that time people had to pass the Brandenburg Gate if they wanted to make their way to the town of Brandenburg, hence the name. The gate leads walkers into the city centre pedestrian zone of Brandenburger Straße in an easterly direction up to priory church of St. Peter and St. Paul.

Since the city wall was demolished around 1900 the Brandenburg Gate has been a free-standing structure.

Sources 
 Paul Sigel, Silke Dähmlow, Frank Seehausen und Lucas Elmenhorst, Architekturführer Potsdam, Dietrich Reimer Verlag, Berlin 2006, .

External links 

Buildings and structures completed in 1771
Buildings and structures in Potsdam
Gates in Germany
Classicism
Triumphal arches in Germany
Prussian cultural sites
Heritage sites in Brandenburg
Tourist attractions in Potsdam
Classicist architecture in Germany
1771 establishments in the Holy Roman Empire